Bathycongrus bleekeri is an eel in the family Congridae (conger/garden eels). It was described by Henry Weed Fowler in 1934. It is a tropical, marine eel which is known from the Philippines, in the western central Pacific Ocean. It is known to dwell at a depth of 51 metres. Males can reach a maximum total length of 8 centimetres.

References

bleekeri
Fish described in 1934